The 1996 CONCACAF U-20 Tournament was a football tournament that was played in April 1996 in Mexico. It determined the four CONCACAF teams that participated at the 1997 FIFA World Youth Championship.

Qualification

|}

|}

Other qualification matches may have been played.

Qualified teams
The following teams entered the tournament:

Squads

Group stage

Group 1

Group 2

Group 3

Final stage

Qualifying group

Championship group

Final ranking

Note: Per statistical convention in football, matches decided in extra time are counted as wins and losses, while matches decided by penalty shoot-out are counted as draws.

Qualification to World Youth Championship
The four best performing teams qualified for the 1997 FIFA World Youth Championship.

References

CONCACAF Under-20 Championship
1996 in youth association football